Reano is a comune (municipality) in the Metropolitan City of Turin in the Italian region Piedmont, located about  west of Turin.

Reano borders the following municipalities: Avigliana, Rosta, Buttigliera Alta, Villarbasse, Trana, and Sangano.

References

Cities and towns in Piedmont